

Regular season
Caroline Ouellette set an NCAA record for most shorthanded goals in one game with 2. This was accomplished on November 14, 2003 versus North Dakota.

Player stats
Note: GP= Games played; G= Goals; A= Assists; PTS = Points; GW = Game Winning Goals; PPL = Power Play Goals; SHG = Short Handed Goals

Postseason

Awards and honors
January 28: Maria Rooth was given her first USCHO Offensive Player of the Week honor.
February 5: Maria Rooth was named as a top 10 candidate for the Patty Kazmaier Award for the third consecutive season.
March 7: Maria Rooth made the All-WCHA First Team 
Erika Holst was the All-WCHA Second Team selection. 
Five Bulldogs were honored with WCHA All-Academic honors: Laurie Alexander, Jessi Flink, Michelle McAteer, Tuula Puputti, Maria Rooth.
March 9: Hanne Sikio, WCHA All Tournament Team forward.
Jenny Potter, Runner-up, Patty Kazmaier Award

References

External links
Official site

Minnesota-Duluth
Minnesota Duluth Bulldogs women's ice hockey seasons